Cedric Wilfred Teguia Noubi (born 1 October 2001) is a professional footballer who plays as a left winger for CF Intercity, on loan from Atlético Madrid. Born in Cameroon, he has represented Spain at youth level.

Club career
Born in Douala, Cedric joined Atlético Madrid's youth setup in 2012. On 4 November 2018, aged just 17, he made his senior debut with the reserves by coming on as a half-time substitute for Pinchi in a 1–1 Segunda División B away draw against Burgos CF.

Cedric scored his first senior goal on 15 September 2019, netting his team's fourth in a 4–0 home routing of UD Las Palmas Atlético. On 27 August of the following year, he moved to Segunda División side Real Oviedo on loan for the 2020–21 season.

Cedric made his professional debut on 13 September 2020, replacing Borja Sánchez in a 0–0 home draw against FC Cartagena. His loan was cut short the following 1 February, and moved to fellow league team Albacete Balompié also in a temporary deal just hours later.

On 24 August 2021, Cedric moved to another reserve team, Celta de Vigo B in Primera División RFEF, on a one-year loan deal.

References

External links

2001 births
Living people
Footballers from Douala
Spanish footballers
Spain youth international footballers
Cameroonian footballers
Cameroonian emigrants to Spain
Naturalised citizens of Spain
Association football wingers
Segunda División players
Primera Federación players
Segunda División B players
Atlético Madrid B players
Real Oviedo players
Albacete Balompié players
Celta de Vigo B players
Córdoba CF players
CF Intercity players
Spanish people of Cameroonian descent
Spanish sportspeople of African descent